Bangladesh Steel and Engineering Corporation or BSEC, is a government owned corporation in Bangladesh.

History 
Bangladesh Steel and Engineering Corporation was founded on 1 July 1976. It is in charge of Pragoti, which assembles Mahindra cars in Bangladesh. In 2016 it signed an agreement with Honda to assemble motorcycles in Bangladesh. It handed over its Dockyard and Engineering Works in Narayanganj and Chittagong Dry Dock Limited in Chattogram to Bangladesh Navy. Formerly owned Chittagong Dry Dock Limited build a six opening footbridge in Sylhet. It also owns GEMCO, a wire manufacturer, and National Tubes in Gazipur.  Its headquarters is the BSEC building in Kawran Bazar, which also houses the headquarters of RTV, NTV and Amar Desh.

See also 
 Bangladesh Blade Factory Limited

References

1976 establishments in Bangladesh
Government-owned companies of Bangladesh
Manufacturing companies based in Dhaka